
Year 624 (DCXXIV) was a leap year starting on Sunday (link will display the full calendar) of the Julian calendar. The denomination 624 for this year has been used since the early medieval period, when the Anno Domini calendar era became the prevalent method in Europe for naming years.

Events 
 By place 

 Byzantine Empire 
 Byzantine–Sasanian War: Emperor Heraclius advances with an expeditionary force (40,000 men) along the Araxes River, destroying the fortress city of Dvin, capital of Armenia, and Nakhchivan (modern Azerbaijan). At Ganzak, Heraclius defeats the Persian army and destroys the famous fire temple at Takht-e Soleymān, an important Zoroastrian shrine. He winters his army in Caucasian Albania to gather forces for the next year.
 Winter – King Khosrow II withdraws most of his troops from Chalcedon (Anatolia); he assembles three armies to trap and destroy Heraclius' forces. The Persians go into winter quarters nearby, but Heraclius attacks them at Tigranakert (Western Armenia), routing the forces of the generals Shahin Vahmanzadegan and Shahraplakan. The Byzantines destroy their baggage train.

 Europe 

 The Visigoths under King Suintila recapture the Byzantine territories of Spania (Andalusia), after 70 years of occupation. Only the Balearic Islands stay a part of the Byzantine Empire.

 Britain 
 Eorpwald succeeds his father Rædwald, as king (bretwalda) of the independent Kingdom of East Anglia (approximate date).

 Arabia 
 March 13 – Battle of Badr: Muhammad and some 300 of his followers from Medina surprise a reinforced Meccan caravan at Badr (modern-day Saudi Arabia) returning from Syria, and defeat about 1,000 Quraysh from Mecca. After having heard that clan leader Abu Sufyan is escorting a rich trade caravan, Muhammad has the wells along its route (southwest of Medina) filled with sand in order to lure him into battle.

 Asia 
 The Yiwen Leiju encyclopedia is completed during the Tang dynasty, by the Chinese calligrapher Ouyang Xun.

 By topic 

 Religion 
 Justus becomes Archbishop of Canterbury, receiving his pallium — symbol of the jurisdiction entrusted to archbishops. He oversees the dispatch of missionaries to Northumbria (northern England).

Births 
 February 17 – Wu Zetian, Empress of the Zhou dynasty (d. 705)
 May – Abd Allah ibn al-Zubayr, Arab sahabi (d. 692)
 Hasan ibn Ali, second Shia Imam and grandson of Prophet Muhammad (d. 670)
 Yazdegerd III, king of the Persian Empire (d. 651)
 Approximate date – Adomnán, Irish abbot and hagiographer (d. 704)

Deaths 
 March 17 – Amr ibn Hishām, Arab polytheist
 April 24 – Mellitus, Archbishop of Canterbury
 Abū Lahab, uncle of Muhammad (approximate date)
 Du Fuwei, rebel leader during the Sui dynasty (b. 598)
 Fu Gongshi, rebel leader during the Sui dynasty
 Gao Kaidao, rebel leader during the Sui dynasty
 Rædwald, king of East Anglia (approximate date)
 Ruqayyah, daughter of Muhammad (approximate date)
 Umayyah ibn Khalaf, clan leader of the Quraysh
 Utbah ibn Rabi'ah, clan leader of the Quraysh

References

Sources